Samuel Joplin Henderson (3 November 1901 – 1980) was an English footballer who played in the Football League for Fulham and South Shields.

References

1901 births
1980 deaths
English footballers
Association football midfielders
English Football League players
Gateshead A.F.C. players
Chelsea F.C. players
Fulham F.C. players
Tunbridge Wells F.C. players
North Shields F.C. players